Tirukkural remains one of the most widely translated non-religious works in the world. As of 2014, there were at least 57 versions available in the English language alone. English, thus, continues to remain the language with most number of translations available of the Kural text.

List of translations
Below is a list of English translations of the Tirukkural till date:

History of English translations

Following the translation of the Kural text into Latin by Constantius Joseph Beschi in 1730, Nathaniel Edward Kindersley attempted the first ever English translation of the Kural text in 1794, translating select couplets in verse. Francis Whyte Ellis attempted the second English translation, who translated only 120 of the 1330 couplets of the Kural text—69 in verse and 51 in prose. In 1840, William Henry Drew translated the first book of the Tirukkural in prose. In 1852, he partially completed the second book, too, in prose. Along with his own English prose translation, his publication contained the original Tamil text, the Tamil commentary by Parimelazhagar and Ramanuja Kavirayar's amplification of the commentary. He thus covered chapters 1 through 63, translating 630 couplets. John Lazarus, a native missionary, revised Drew's work and completed the remaining portion, beginning from Chapter 64 through Chapter 133. Thus, Drew and Lazarus together made the first complete prose translation of the Tirukkural available in English. Meanwhile, there were two more verse translations made in 1872 and 1873 by Charles E. Gover and Edward Jewitt Robinson, respectively. While Gover translated only select couplets, Robinson translated the first two books of the Kural text. The first complete verse translation in English and the first complete English translation by a single author was achieved in 1886 by George Uglow Pope, whose work brought the Tirukkural to a wider audience of the western world.

The first English translation by a native scholar (i.e., scholar who is a native speaker of Tamil) was made in 1915 by T. Tirunavukkarasu, who translated 366 couplets into English. The first complete English translation by a native scholar was made the following year by V. V. S. Aiyar, who translated the entire work in prose. Aiyar's work is considered by various scholars, including Czech scholar Kamil Zvelebil, to be the most scholarly of all the English translations made until then, including those by native English scholars.

At least 24 complete translations were available in the English language by the end of the twentieth century, by both native and non-native scholars. By 2014, there were about 57 versions available in English, of which at least 30 were complete.

Comparison
The following table illustrates two different facets of a subject depicted by two Kural couplets from the same chapter and their different interpretations by various translators.

Less-known translations
The Kural has also been translated numerous times without getting published or reaching the masses. Sri Aurobindo, for instance, has translated fifteen couplets of the Kural, including all the ten couplets from the opening chapter (in a different order from the original) and five from the second chapter, in 1919 as part of his translations of various other ancient works.

See also
 Tirukkural translations
 List of Tirukkural translations by language
 List of translators into English

References

Published translations
 Pope, G. U. (1886). The Sacred Kurral of Tiruvalluva Nayanar (with Latin Translation By Fr. Beschi) (Original in Tamil with English and Latin Translations). New Delhi: Asian Educational Services, pp. i–xxviii, 408
 Satguru Sivaya Subramuniyaswami. (1979). Tirukkural: The American English and Modern Tamil Translations of an Ethical Masterpiece. . Available from http://www.redlotusworld.org/resources/Tirukkural.pdf
 Padmanabhan, V. (2003). Thirukkural with English Explanation. Chennai: Manimekalai Prasuram, 280 pp.
 Murugan, V. (2009). Thirukkural in English. Chennai: Arivu Pathippagam, xiv + 272 pp.
 Guruparan, S. P. (2014). Thirukkural: English Translation. Chennai: Mayilavan Padhippagam, 416 pp.
 Venkatachalam, R. (2015). Thirukkural—Translation—Explanation: A Life Skills Coaching Approach. Gurgaon, India: Partridge Publishing India, 689 pp. .

Further reading
 Srirama Desikan, S. N. (1961). Tiruvalluvar's Tirukkural in Sanskrit slokas. Prabha Press. 77 pp.
 Manavalan, A. A. (2010). A Compendium of Tirukkural Translations in English (4 vols.). Chennai: Central Institute of Classical Tamil, .

External links 
 Tirukkural in Tamil and English—Valaitamil.com
 G. U. Pope's English Translation of the Tirukkural

 https://www.facebook.com/Tirukkural.in.6.languages/

English
Tirukkural
Translation-related lists